D531 is a state road connecting the A1 motorway in Vrpolje interchange to D58 state road. The road is 2.1 km long.

The road, as well as all other state roads in Croatia, is managed and maintained by Hrvatske ceste, state owned company.

Traffic volume 

The D531 state road traffic volume is not reported by Hrvatske ceste, however they regularly count and report traffic volume on the A1 motorway Vrpolje interchange, which connects to the D531 road only, thus permitting the D531 road traffic volume to be accurately calculated. The report includes no information on ASDT volumes.

Road junctions and populated areas

Sources

State roads in Croatia
Transport in Zadar County